The following are the national records in Olympic weightlifting in Georgia. Records are maintained in each weight class for the snatch lift, clean and jerk lift, and the total for both lifts by the Georgian Weightlifting Federation (GEOWF).

Current records

Men

Women

Historical records

Men (1998–2018)

Women (1998–2018)

References

External links
 GEOWF web site

Georgia
Records
Olympic weightlifting
weightlifting